List of adverse effects of valproic acid by frequency:

Very common (>10%)

 Nausea
 Vomiting
 Diarrhea
 Headache
 Low platelet count (dose-related)
 Tremor (dose-related)
 Hair loss (usually temporary)
 Drowsiness
 Dizziness
 Hyperandrogenism in females
 Seeing double
 Indigestion
 Lazy eye
 Infection
 Tinnitus

 Elevated aminotransferase concentrations (dose-related; indicative of liver injury)

Common (1-10%)

 Paresthesia
 Abdominal pain
 Tremor
 Increased appetite
 Weight gain
 Ataxia
 Polycystic ovaries
 Memory impairment
 Menstrual irregularities
 Rash
 Back pain
 Mood changes
 Anxiety
 Confusion
 Abnormal gait
 Hallucinations
 Catatonia
 Dysarthria
 Tardive dyskinesia
 Vertigo

 High blood levels of ammonia without symptoms

Uncommon (0.1-1%)
 Peripheral edema
 Syndrome of inappropriate secretion of antidiuretic hormone

Rare (<0.1% frequency)

 Liver failure
 Pancreatitis (these two usually occur in first 6 months and can be fatal)
 Leukopenia (low white blood cell count)
 Neutropenia (low neutrophil count)
 Pure red cell aplasia
 Agranulocytosis
 Extrapyramidal syndrome (including parkinsonism, may be reversible)
 Brain problems due to high ammonia levels
 Low body temperature
 Hypersensitivity reactions including multi-organ hypersensitivity syndrome
 Eosinophilic pleural effusion
 Bone fractures (reduced BMD with long-term use)

References

Valproic acid